Melinda Jane Duer  is Professor of Biological and Biomedical Chemistry in the Department of Chemistry at the University of Cambridge, and was the first woman to be appointed to an academic position in the department. Her research investigates changes in molecular structure of the extracellular matrix in tissues in disease and during ageing. She serves as Deputy Warden of Robinson College, Cambridge. She is an editorial board member of the Journal of Magnetic Resonance.

Early life and education 
Duer attended Sir James Smith's School, a comprehensive school in North Cornwall. She enjoyed science at high school and was encouraged by her chemistry teacher to study natural sciences at Emmanuel College, Cambridge, where she specialized in chemistry. She was the first member of her family to attend higher education. Duer went on to complete her PhD in 1988 in theoretical chemistry with Malcolm Gerloch, where she investigated ligand field theory.

Research and career 
During the course of her PhD research, Duer developed an interest in nuclear magnetic resonance spectroscopy (NMR) while chatting with Lynn Gladden who frequently worked on the spectrometer in the room opposite Duer's office at the time. Towards the end of her PhD, Duer proposed using solid-state NMR to investigate organometallic catalytic species in response to an advertised temporary lectureship in the department. Thus, she became the first woman to be appointed to a lectureship in the Department of Chemistry at the University of Cambridge in 1988. In 1990, she was awarded a Royal Society University Research Fellowship.

Duer begun her research in solid-state NMR by investigating molecular mobility in porous materials in collaboration with Gladden who has moved to the Department of Chemical Engineering. She went on to investigate molecular mobility more broadly, in polymers and other solids. With a theoretical chemistry background and through discussions with Malcolm Levitt and others, Duer also developed solid-state NMR experiments to probe anisotropic interactions, such as quadrupolar interactions and chemical shift anisotropy. In 2001 and 2004, she published two books on solid-state NMR, targeted at graduate students.

In early 2000s, Duer pioneered the use of solid-state NMR to investigate biological tissues, including keratin and bones, frequently obtained from horses due to her interest in horse riding. Her previous research on liquid crystal phases of polymers led her to wonder whether similar phases could form in keratin.

Duer has extensively investigated the extracellular matrix, the component of biological tissues that simultaneously serves as the communication system between cells and provides a scaffold to support them. She is particularly interested in the molecular mechanisms that underpin the functions of the extracellular matrix. By understanding the structure-property relationships of biological tissue, Duer works to unravel the processes that give rise to collagenous tissue and mineralisation.

Duer has investigated the calcification of blood vessels that occurs when people age. She proposed that the hardening of arteries caused by the build-up of calcium may be triggered by polymeric adenosine diphosphate ribose (PAR), a molecule that is produced when the DNA inside cells is damaged. One of her graduate students launched a spin-out company, Cycle Pharmaceuticals, which provides personalised treatment to patients with vascular diseases. She was promoted to Professor in 2015.

Duer was awarded the Royal Society of Chemistry Interdisciplinary Prize in 2017, and the Suffrage Science award in 2019.

Commercial ventures 
Apart from licensing novel treatment for treating vascular disease to Cycle Pharmaceuticals, Duer is a co-founder of Cambridge Oncology Ltd.

Mentoring and international development 

Duer is part of the Strategic Advisory Group of the Cambridge-Africa Programme, an initiative by the University of Cambridge to strengthen research capacity with African universities and research institutions. In this role, Duer mentors African academics such as Dr Mercy Badu of Kwame Nkrumah University of Science and Technology.

As a previous holder of the Suffrage Science award, Duer nominated Dr Mary Anti Chama of the University of Ghana for the same award in 2021.

Selected publications

Journal articles

Books

Personal life 
Duer used to be an equestrian, and has said that her interest in biological chemistry started with studying keratin in horses hooves and understanding leg fractures in one of her rescue horses.  Her other interests include cycling and competing in triathlons.

References 

English biochemists
Alumni of Emmanuel College, Cambridge
People associated with the University of Cambridge
Royal Society University Research Fellows
Fellows of Robinson College, Cambridge
Living people
English chemists
21st-century English scientists
21st-century English educators
1963 births
Members of the University of Cambridge Department of Chemistry